Workers National Party (in Spanish: Partido Nacional de los Trabajadores) is a small far-right political party in Spain. In the 2004 parliamentary elections, PNT got 379 votes.

The PNT defended the hardening of the penalties for offenders, death penalty for terrorists, opposed immigration, supported the unity of Spain, and opposed same-sex marriage.

In March 2000, PNT joined the coalition España 2000.

External links
 PNT website

Political parties in the Region of Murcia
Far-right political parties in Spain
Fascist parties in Spain